Abu Ibrahimer Mirtu (Abu Ibrahim's Death) is a Bengali novel written by Shahidul Zahir. This is Zahir's fourth novel posthumously published by Mowla Brothers in 2009. Written against the backdrop of the reign of the then dictator Hussein Muhammad Ershad, it is a novella, the story of which is rich in connotations and commentary on human experience. The dedication of the novel reads: "People does die, of course, but the meaning of death is different..." Also includes "A person is inherently dead, or heavier than Taishan, or lighter than a feather" quote by Chinese historian Sima Qian (206 BC – AD 220). The novel won the Prothom Alo Borsho Shera Boi award in 2009.

Publications
Before being published as a book, Abu Ibrahimer Mirtu was published in Nipun on 6 June 1991. Later, the first print was published by Mowla Brothers in Dhaka in February 2009 and the third in February 2020.

Character
 Abu Ibrahim - Government employee
 Mamata - Abu Ibrahim's wife
 Bindu - Abu Ibrahim's daughter
 Helen - Abu Ibrahim's classmate
 Siddik Hosen - Office Boss

Award

References

External links

2009 novels
Bengali-language novels
Bangladeshi novels
Novels by Shahidul Zahir